The Central District of Farahan County is a district (bakhsh) in Farahan County, Markazi Province, Iran. At the 2006 census, its population was 15,786, in 4,591 families.  The District has two cities: Farmahin & Khenejin. The District has one rural district (dehestan): Farmahin Rural District.

References 

Farahan County
Districts of Markazi Province